John William Morton (February 13, 1879 – September 5, 1950) was a British athlete who competed at the 1908 Summer Olympics in London. He was born in Handsworth, West Midlands and died in Brighton.

In the 100 metres, Morton won his first round heat with a time of 11.2 seconds to advance to the semifinals. There, he placed third and last in his race, not advancing to the final.

Morton placed second in his preliminary heat of the 200 metres with a time of 23.1 seconds. He did not advance to the semifinals.

1910 Morton was editor for "How to Run 100 Yards" issued by Spalding Athletic Library.

References

Sources
 profile
 
 
 

1879 births
1950 deaths
British male sprinters
Olympic athletes of Great Britain
Athletes (track and field) at the 1908 Summer Olympics
Sportspeople from Handsworth, West Midlands